Hervey Chittenden Calkin (March 23, 1828 – April 20, 1913) was an American tradesman and politician who served one term as a U.S. Representative from New York from 1869 to 1871,

Life and career
Hervey Calkin was born in Malden, New York on March 23, 1828.  He was educated locally, and moved to New York City in 1847.

Calkin was employed in the Morgan Iron Works for five years.  In 1852 he commenced business as a plumber and coppersmith in partnership with his brother.  He also sold other metalware, including stoves and tinware.

Calkin also became an advocate for the creation of a domestic shipbuilding industry, as opposed to buying ships from England.

Tenure in Congress 
He was elected as a Democrat to the Forty-first Congress and served from (March 4, 1869 – March 3, 1871).  He was not a candidate for reelection in 1870.

Later career 
After leaving Congress, Calkin resumed his former business pursuits in New York City until retiring in 1904.  In 1871 he received a patent for a life raft made of two cylindrical metal floats with conical ends and a plank deck.

Death 
He died in the Bronx on April 20, 1913, and was interred in Woodlawn Cemetery.

References

External resources

1828 births
1913 deaths
People from Saugerties, New York
Politicians from New York City
Burials at Woodlawn Cemetery (Bronx, New York)
Democratic Party members of the United States House of Representatives from New York (state)
19th-century American politicians